East Blackdene is a hamlet in County Durham, in England. It is situated to the north of the River Wear, on the opposite side of Weardale from St John's Chapel.

References

Hamlets in County Durham
Stanhope, County Durham